"The Night We Met" is a song recorded by American band Lord Huron for their second studio album, Strange Trails (2015). Following its inclusion in the Netflix series 13 Reasons Why, "The Night We Met" entered the record charts in several countries, including in Australia, Canada, France, the United Kingdom, and the United States. It was certified platinum by the Recording Industry Association of America for combined sales and streaming figures exceeding one million units.

Background 
"The Night We Met" was written and produced by Ben Schneider, and mixed by Rick Parker. "The Night We Met" was recorded at Russian Recording, USA, and Whispering Pines.

Release 
The song quickly got a huge amount of success after being featured in 13 Reasons Why, and it was "subsequently confirmed platinum nearly two years after it was released". The song has been streamed over one billion times. "The Night We Met" immediately turned into the band's most well known song. The song is used in the season finale of The Originals, season 2, when Rebekah takes on a new body and parts ways with Marcel. It also appears in 13 Reasons Why episode 5 when the main character, Clay, and Hannah dance together. Refinery29 described it as "a time machine to him and Hannah at their happiest". After being featured in the series, the song garnered a band deal with Republic Records.

Marissa Matozzo of Paste labelled the song as "one of the band's most renowned tracks". "The Night We Met" appeared in a 3rd position in a "Relaxing Tracks That You Can Sing Along To" list compiled by Entertainment.ie. Erin Vierra of Mxdwn wrote, "The Night We Met" is the kind of song one likes to hold on to late at night, the kind of song that fills the listener with a peaceful meditation". The Musical Hype wrote, "This is a sensational song aside from the buzz its received in the mainstream. The lyrics are poetic, while the sound and vibe of the record are mysterious". Under the Radar described the song as "heartbreaking waltz".

"The Night We Met" reached number 5 on US Hot Rock Songs (Billboard), and number 7 on US Adult Alternative Songs (Billboard) charts. In 2019, Lord Huron performed two versions of the song: one version for 13 Reasons Why and a version featuring Phoebe Bridgers in Hollywood Bowl.

The song was certified two-times platinum with 2 million units sold, and it was certified gold in France (with 100,000 units sold) and United Kingdom (with 400,000 units sold).

Music video 
The music video was uploaded to Lord Huron's YouTube channel on May 15, 2017 and has accumulated more than 194 million views as of January 2023.

Usage in media
"The Night We Met" has been featured in:
 The Flash: season 1, episode 18
 13 Reasons Why: season 1, episode 5 and season 2, episode 13
 The Originals: season 2, episode 22
 9-1-1: Lone Star: season 1, episode 10
 Budweiser tribute to Dale Earnhardt Jr. in his final season of racing in NASCAR
 Roswell, New Mexico: season 3, episode 3
 The Night Shift: season 2, episode 4
 The Affair: season 5, episode 4
 Sounds Like Love
 A Ghost Story

Charts

Weekly charts

Year-end charts

Certifications

References

2015 songs
2017 singles
Lord Huron songs
Iamsound Records singles